Krabi-Krabong is a weapon-based martial art from Thailand. It is closely related to other Southeast Asian fighting styles such as Pencak Silat Indonesia, Burmese banshay and Cambodian kbach kun boran. The royal bodyguard corps of the late King Bhumibol Adulyadej (Rama IX) were said to be highly trained in krabi-krabong.

Weapons 

The system's name refers to its main weapons, namely the Thai sword (krabi) and staff (krabong). Typically, two swords (daab song mue) are wielded as a pair. Unarmed krabi-krabong (muay boran) makes use of kicks, pressure point strikes, joint locks, holds, and throws.

The weapons of krabi-krabong include the following:
 Krabi: sabre/curved sword
 Daab: single-edge sword
 Krabong: stick/ cudgel, usually either paired or used with a shield. Not very popular in present-day so often gets confused with long pole
 Daab song mue: Thai double swords, one in each hand
 Kean/Lo: buckler/shield made from wood or buffalo hide
 Phlong: staff/pole, often mislabeled as Krabong
 Ngao: bladed staff
 Mai sok san: a pair of clubs worn on the forearms

Origins

Krabi–krabong was developed by the ancient Thai warriors for fighting on the battlefield. It was likely used in conjunction with muay boran  but whether the two arts were developed together or independently is uncertain. Early warfare in Indochina was mostly between rival kingdoms and were fought en masse. Individual fighters were armoured and carried rhino hide shields.  The Burmese invasion of 1767 resulted in the loss of many historical records and cultural documents. However, the Thai fighting arts were traditionally passed down orally and did not rely on written documents for their preservation.  Simon de la Loubère, the French diplomat from the court of Louis XIV, observed the existence of muay Thai  and Krabi–krabong in his famous account Du Royaume de Siam (1689) while visiting the Ayutthaya Kingdom in 1688.

Archaeological findings and classical dances bear testament to the myriad of weapons that were once used in Thailand.  Some of them are no longer found in the country's martial arts today, such as the kris (dagger), hawk (spear), trishula (either long or tekpi "short-handled trident"), daab (straight sword) and vajra.  Entire dances were built on individual weapons,  and calisthenics used by the modern Thai military are still based on these dances.

The weapons, their design and the pre-fight war dance in krabi-krabong show evidence of Indian derivation combined with Chinese characteristics. South Indian scholars, holy men, settlers and traders were especially influential in the evolution of Thai culture and martial arts. The Tamil stick-fighting style of silambam was of particular importance to the history of numerous Southeast Asian fighting systems. During the colonial period, silambam became more common in Southeast Asia than in India where it was banned by the British rulers.

Asian elephants were an integral part of warfare in Thailand. They would commonly be mounted by higher-ranking warriors like generals or royalty. To choose a successor to Intaraja I, his two sons fought on elephants. Krabi–krabong was often practiced by the palace mahouts  or elephant trainers. From the back of an elephant, archers could shoot arrows at enemies below or, if he was wielding a polearm, engage in hand-to-hand combat with another mounted fighter. After the 15th-century introduction of gunpowder, elephants served as tanks with cannons mounted on their backs. The legs were the war-elephant's weak spot, so they had to be guarded by up to four foot soldiers. Although mahouts no longer practice martial arts, reenactments of such battles are staged by performers who are often from families that have been training elephants since the Ayutthaya Kingdom.

As Indochinese trade extended to Japan, small communities of Japanese people were living and trading around the region. After the Battle Of Sekigahara in 1600, many of those from the losing side of the war came to Thailand. Others were pirates or official traders who arrived on the Red Seal Ships. The Japanese fled Ayutthaya after the Bamars invaded in 1767 but they left their influence on the local fighting arts. Many of the techniques, stances, weapons and throws of krabi-krabong are similar to those found in jujutsu and Okinawan kobudō.

In Thailand, as with other countries in Southern and Southeast Asia, monks acted as teachers to their local community. Young boys would be sent to the temples where, aside from learning about Theravada Buddhism, they would be taught subjects ranging from languages to astrology. One such establishment was the Buddhaisawan Temple in Ayutthaya where the monks taught sword-fighting to their students. The origin of these monks is unknown but they are believed to have come from the kingdom of Lan Na in Northern Thailand. The modern Buddhaisawan Sword Fighting Institute was led by Sumai Mesamana until his death in 1998. His son Pramote Mesamana began training in krabi-krabong at the age of 6. According to the younger Mesamana, the art was passed down in his family from father to son ever since the Ayutthaya Kingdom.

Historical practitioners

Naresuan the Great
During the 16th century, the First Toungoo Empire ruled over parts of Thailand. Naresuan was born to King Maha Thammaracha but until the age of 16 he was a hostage of the Bamars. Upon his return to the Ayutthaya Kingdom, he renounced allegiance to Bamars on behalf of his father the king. Having studied at Wat Buddhaisawan, Naresuan was well-versed in fighting with the single-edge sword (daab). The Bamars attacked the capital numerous times in succession but were always repelled by Naresuan's forces. In a final attempt to retake their Thai states, the Bamars sent an army of 25,000 warriors led by Mingyi Swa, the crown prince of Burma atop a war-elephant.

Knowing he was outnumbered, Naresuan charged his own elephant through the Burmese soldiers and fought directly with the prince. Using a halberd (ngao), Naresuan cleaved the crown prince in two from the shoulder to the hip. With their monarch now dead, the Burmese fled the battlefield and wouldn't become a serious threat to Thai sovereignty for more than a century. Naresuan ascended the throne in 1590 and under his rule the Thai encompassed the Shan States and part of Cambodia.

King Taksin
The Ayutthaya Kingdom became progressively weaker during the eighteenth century. The Thais and Burmese had been almost constantly fighting each other along the border territories since the time of King Naresuan the Great. In 1758 the Bamars began a siege which lasted nine years. Buildings, palaces and temples were laid to ruins while documents, archives and records were all destroyed. Royal treasures were stolen and all but 10,000 of the city's one million inhabitants were sold into slavery.

Taksin learned krabi-krabong while studying in Wat Buddhaisawan as a boy. But more than his martial expertise, it was Taksin's skill as a military strategist that allowed him to quickly attain the rank of general. Before the capture of Ayutthaya, the young general Taksin fled with 500 followers to Rayong. He reorganised his forces and began attacking the Burmese invaders in small bands, destroying their supply routes. Word spread and within a few months Taksin rallied the Thai people to battle once again. Despite being only half the size of the Burmese army, Taksin's troops managed to drive out the conquerors and restored Thailand to nearly its former size. With the previous king, Ekkathat, now dead, Taksin was convinced that he was Gautama Buddha's reincarnation and proclaimed himself king in 1767. Seven years later, he decided to give up his role as military commander and instead sent out generals to campaign in his stead.

Among all the warriors under Taksin's command, the greatest fighter was Phraya Pichai Daab Hak, a nickname meaning "broken sword". Phraya Pichai was an expert with the dual swords (daab song mue) and acquired his moniker during a battle in which he continued fighting after one of his swords was broken. Another notable general was Rama I. Though not as skilled a martial artist as Phraya Pichai, Chakri was as brilliant a commander as Taksin. Under his leadership, Siam captured the Lao Kingdom of Vientiane, Luang Prabang, and Chiang Mai.

Taksin ruled from 1767–1782, but near the end of his reign he became increasingly dictatorial. He was said to have frequently flogged Buddhists monks and executed some of his concubines on false charges. A revolt broke out in the capital of the Thonburi Kingdom and it was agreed by both the army and the nobility that Chakri should take Taksin's place as king. The current royal family of Thailand is descended from King Chakri, also called Rama I. Taksin himself was put to death but not in a conventional beheading. Instead, Taksin was wrapped in a velvet bag and beaten to death by his ministers with clubs. This method of execution was instituted to avoid spilling royal blood, and Taksin is the only known Thai king to have been killed in such a way.

See also

Angampora
Banshay
Bataireacht
Bōjutsu
Gatka
Jūkendō
Kalaripayattu
Kendo
Kenjutsu
Krabi–krabong
Kuttu Varisai
Mardani khel
Silambam
Silambam Asia
Tahtib
Thang-ta
Varma kalai
World Silambam Association
Muay Thai
Lethwei
Kbach kun boran
Silat

References

Further reading

Wei, Lindsey (2020) Path of the Spiritual Warrior: Life and Teachings of Muay Thai Fighter Pedro Solana.

External links

Sitsiam Camp/Buddhai Swan  
Krabi Krabong: The Buddhai Sawan Path
General Tienchai Sirisumpahn World Muay Thai Boran Academy
Krabi-Krabong - Thai Weapons
Krabi Krabong Martial Artist Pedro Solana

Thai martial arts
Sports originating in Thailand